Cleeve railway station was a station in Stoke Orchard, Gloucestershire, England. The station was named for the nearby village of Bishop's Cleeve.

History
The station was opened in 1841, closed to passengers in 1950 and closed completely in 1960.

Stationmasters

Mr. Mayhew ca. 1850
W. Overbury until 1860
J. Furniss from 1861 
H. Mabbott until 1877
James Hadley 1877- 1903
F.A. Done 1903 - 1905
J. Harford 1905 - 1908
W. Sugars from 1908 
Herbert Best 1909 - 1911 (afterwards station master at Rubery)
Leslie Jones ca. 1946

References

Further reading

Disused railway stations in Gloucestershire
Railway stations in Great Britain opened in 1841
Railway stations in Great Britain closed in 1950
Former Midland Railway stations